Villarvolard is a former municipality in the district of Gruyère in the canton of Fribourg in Switzerland.  On 1 January 2011 it was merged with the municipality of Corbières.

References

Municipalities of the canton of Fribourg